The General Electric F118 is a non-afterburning turbofan engine produced by GE Aviation, and is derived from the General Electric F110 afterburning turbofan.

Design and development

The F118 is a non-afterburning derivative of the F110 specially developed for the B-2 Spirit stealth bomber. A single stage HP turbine drives the 9 stage HP compressor, while a 2-stage LP turbine drives the 3 stage fan. The combustor is annular. In 1998, the USAF's Lockheed U-2S fleet was fitted with a modified version of the F118.

Variants
F118-GE-100
Variant for the B-2
F118-GE-101
Variant for the U-2S

Applications
 Lockheed U-2S
 Northrop Grumman B-2 Spirit

Specifications (F118-100)

See also

References

Notes

Bibliography

External links

 GE Aviation Military Engines page

Low-bypass turbofan engines
F118
1980s turbofan engines